Sport Fishing is an outdoors magazine about recreational marine fishing owned by Bonnier Corp. It is a sister magazine of Salt Water Sportsman and Marlin. Sport Fishing was launched in Winter Park, Florida, in February 1986, by World Publications.

Sport Fishing editorial coverage includes new saltwater-fishing techniques and destinations and insight about buying and using fishing tackle and boats. Its editors are outspoken in defense of sound fisheries conservation, sensible management and safeguarding angler access to fishing.

References 

Sports magazines published in the United States
Magazines established in 1986
Bonnier Group
Eight times annually magazines published in the United States
Bimonthly magazines published in the United States
Magazines published in Florida